Senator Brock may refer to:

Members of the United States Senate
Bill Brock (1930–2021), U.S. Senator from Tennessee from 1971 to 1977
William Emerson Brock (1872–1950), U.S. Senator from Tennessee from 1929 to 1931

United States state senate members
Andrew C. Brock (born 1974), North Carolina State Senate
Randy Brock (born 1943), Vermont State Senate
Robert K. Brock (1878–1962), Virginia State Senate